Zenin is a Russian masculine surname, its feminine counterpart is Zenina. Notable people with the surname include:

Andrei Zenin (born 1991), Russian football player
Vasily Zenin (born 1930), Russian wrestler

Russian-language surnames